Blood and Honor may refer to:
Blood and Honor (German: Blut und Ehre), the motto of the Hitler Youth
Blood and Honor: Youth Under Hitler (German: Blut und Ehre: Jugend Unter Hitler), a German/American made for TV mini-series
Blood & Honour, a UK neo-Nazi music promotion network and political group
Blood and Honor (novel), a novel set in the fictional Dungeons & Dragons Eberron setting

See also 
 Honour & Blood, a 1984 Tank album